The right to sexuality incorporates the right to express one's sexuality and to be free from discrimination on the grounds of sexual orientation. Specifically, it relates to the human rights of people of diverse sexual orientations, including lesbian, gay, bisexual and transgender (LGBT) people, and the protection of those rights, although it is equally applicable to heterosexuality. The right to sexuality and freedom from discrimination on the grounds of sexual orientation is based on the universality of human rights and the inalienable nature of rights belonging to every person by virtue of being human.

No right to sexuality exists explicitly in international human rights law; rather, it is found in a number of international human rights instruments including the Universal Declaration of Human Rights, the International Covenant on Civil and Political Rights and the International Covenant on Economic, Social and Cultural Rights.

Definition
The concept of the right to sexuality is difficult to define, as it comprises various rights from within the framework of international human rights law.

Sexual orientation is defined in the Preamble to the Yogyakarta Principles as "each person’s capacity for profound emotional, affectional and sexual attraction to, and intimate and sexual relations with, individuals of a different gender or the same gender or more than one gender".

Freedom from discrimination on the grounds of sexual orientation is found in the Universal Declaration of Human Rights (UDHR) and the International Covenant on Civil and Political Rights (ICCPR).

The UDHR provides for non-discrimination in Article 2, which states that:
Everyone is entitled to all the rights and freedoms set forth in this Declaration, without distinction of any kind, such as race, colour, sex, language, religion, political or other opinion, national or social origin, property, birth or other status. Furthermore, no distinction shall be made on the basis of the political, jurisdictional or international status of the country or territory to which a person belongs, whether it be independent, trust, non-self-governing or under any other limitation of sovereignty.

Sexual orientation can be read into Article 2 as "other status" or alternatively as falling under "sex".

In the ICCPR, Article 2 sets out a similar provision for non-discrimination:
Each State Party to the present Covenant undertakes to respect and to ensure to all individuals within its territory and subject to its jurisdiction the rights recognized in the present Covenant, without distinction of any kind, such as race, colour, sex, language, religion, political or other opinion, national or social origin, property, birth or other status.

In Toonen v Australia the United Nations Human Rights Committee (UNHRC) found that the reference to "sex" in Article 2 of the ICCPR included sexual orientation, thereby making sexual orientation prohibited grounds of distinction in respect of the enjoyment of rights under the ICCPR.

The right to be free from discrimination is the basis of the right to sexuality, but it is closely related to the exercise and protection of other fundamental human rights.

Background
Individuals of diverse sexual orientations have been discriminated against historically and continue to be a "vulnerable" group in society today. Forms of discrimination experienced by people of diverse sexual orientations include the denial of the right to life, the right to work and the right to privacy, non-recognition of personal and family relationships, interference with human dignity, interference with security of the person, violations of the right to be free from torture, discrimination in access to economic, social and cultural rights, including housing, health and education, and pressure to remain silent and invisible.

Seventy-eight countries maintain laws that make same-sex consensual sex between adults a criminal offence, and seven countries (or parts thereof) impose the death penalty for same-sex consensual sex. They are Iran, Saudi Arabia, Yemen, Mauritania, Sudan, the twelve northern states of Nigeria, and the southern parts of Somalia.

The right to sexuality has only relatively recently become the subject of international concern, with the regulation of sexuality traditionally falling within the jurisdiction of the nation state. Today numerous international non-governmental organisations and intergovernmental organisations are engaged in the protection of the rights of people of diverse sexual orientation as it is increasingly recognised that discrimination on grounds of sexual orientation is widespread and an unacceptable violation of human rights.

Acts of violence
Acts of violence against LGBT people are often especially vicious compared to other bias-motivated crimes and include killings, kidnappings, beatings, rape, and psychological violence, including threats, coercion and arbitrary depravations of liberty.

Examples of violent acts against people of diverse sexual orientation are too numerous to account here, and they occur in all parts of the world. A particularly distressing example is the sexual assault and murder of fifteen lesbians in Thailand in March 2012. In that example, two lesbian couples were killed by men who objected to their relationship and who were embarrassed when they were unable to convince the women into heterosexual relationships with themselves.

Often acts of violence against people of diverse sexual orientation are perpetrated by the victim's own family. In a case in Zimbabwe, the multiple rape of a lesbian was organised by her own family in an attempt to "cure" her of homosexuality.

In those cases, as in many other cases of violence against people of diverse sexual orientation, State law enforcement authorities are complicit in human rights abuses for failing to persecute violators of rights.

Breach of the right to privacy

The right to privacy is a protected freedom under the UDHR, and the ICCPR which reflects the "widespread, if not universal, human need to pursue certain activities within an intimate sphere, free of outside interference. The possibility to do so is fundamental to personhood." Intimate relationships, whether between two people of the same sex or of different sexes, are among those activities that are subject to a right of privacy.

It has been successfully argued in a number of cases that criminalization of homosexual relationships is an interference with the right to privacy, including decisions in the European Court of Human Rights and the UNHRC.

The freedom to decide on one's own consensual adult relationships, including the gender of that person, without the interference of the State is a fundamental human right. To prohibit the relationships of people of diverse sexual orientation is a breach of the right to sexuality and the right to privacy.

Freedom of expression, assembly and association

Every person, by virtue of their individual autonomy, is free to express themselves, assemble and join in association with others. Freedom of expression is a protected human right under Article 19 of the UDHR and Article 19 of the ICCPR, as is the right to freedom of assembly under Article 20 of the UDHR and Article 21 of the ICCPR.

LGBT people are discriminated against in respect of their ability to defend and promote their rights. Gay pride marches, peaceful demonstrations and other events promoting LGBT rights are often banned by State governments.

In 2011 gay pride marches were banned in Serbia and another march in Moscow was broken up by police, who arrested thirty leading gay rights activists.

Yogyakarta principles
In 2005, twenty-nine experts undertook the drafting of the Yogyakarta Principles on the Application of International Human Rights Law in relation to Sexual Orientation and Gender Identity. The document was intended to set out experiences of human rights violations against people of diverse sexual orientation and transgender people, the application of international human rights law to those experiences and the nature of obligations on States in respect of those experiences.

The Principles can be broadly categorised into the following:
 Principles 1 to 3 set out the universality of human rights and their application to all persons.
 Principles 4 to 11 address fundamental rights to life, freedom from violence and torture, privacy, access to justice and freedom from arbitrary detention.
 Principles 12 to 18 set out non-discrimination in relation of economic, social and cultural rights, including employment, accommodation, social security, education and health.
 Principles 19 to 21 emphasise the importance of freedom of expression, identity and sexuality, without State interference, including peaceful assembly.
 Principles 22 and 23 set out the right to seek asylum from persecution of based on sexual orientation.
 Principles 24 to 26 set out the right to participate in family and cultural life and public affairs.
 Principle 27 sets out the right to promote and defend human rights without discrimination based on sexual orientation.
 Principles 28 and 29 emphasise the importance of holding those who violate human rights accountable, and ensuring redress for those who face rights violations.

The Yogyakarta Principles is an instrument of soft law and is therefore not binding. But it does provide an important standard for States in their obligation to protect the rights of individuals of diverse sexual orientation.

The United Nations

On June 17, 2011 the United Nations Human Rights Council in a Resolution on Human Rights, Sexual Orientation and Gender Identity, adopted by a vote of 23 in favour, 19 against, and 3 abstentions, requested the commission of a study to document discriminatory laws and acts of violence against people based on their sexual orientation and gender identity.

The 2011 Resolution was intended to shed light on how international human rights could be used to prevent acts of violence and discrimination against people of diverse sexual orientation.

On 15 December 2011 the first Report on human rights of LGBT people was released by the Office of the United Nations High Commissioner for Human Rights.

The Report made the following recommendations. In order to prevent such acts of violence occurring, United Nations Member States are recommended to:
 Promptly investigate all reported killings and serious incidents of violence against LGBT people, regardless of whether carried out privately or publicly, by State or non-State actors, ensuring accountability for such violations and the establishment of reporting mechanisms for such incidents.
 Take measures to prevent torture and other forms of cruel, inhuman or degrading treatment, ensure accountability for such violations and establish reporting mechanisms.
 Repeal laws that criminalize homosexuality, same-sex sexual conduct, other criminal laws that detain people based on their sexuality and abolish the death penalty for offences involving consensual sexual relations within same-sex relationships.
 Enact comprehensive anti-discrimination legislation, ensuring that combating discrimination based on sexual orientation is in the mandates of national human rights bodies.
 Ensure that freedom of expression, association and peaceful assembly can be exercised safely without discrimination on sexual orientation or gender identity.
 Implement appropriate training programmes for law enforcement personnel, and support public information campaigns to counter homophobia and transphobia amongst the general public and in schools.
 Facilitate legal recognition of preferred gender of transgender persons.

Further action is yet to be taken by the United Nations, although a proposed declaration on sexual orientation and gender identity was brought before the United Nations General Assembly in 2008. However, that declaration has not been officially adopted by the General Assembly and remains open for signatories.

See also
 Antisexualism
 Bodily integrity
 Disability and sexuality
 Homophobia
 LGBT rights by country or territory
 LGBT rights opposition
 LGBT social movements
 Religion and homosexuality
 Reproductive rights
 Sex-positive movement
 Sex workers' rights
 Sexual and reproductive health and rights

References

External links
 Amnesty International USA: LGBT legal status around the world
 Office of the High Commissioner for Human Rights
 Sexual Orientation and Gender Identity in International Human Rights Law  International Commission of Jurists.

Discrimination
Freedom of expression
Freedom of speech
Human rights
Human sexuality
LGBT